Penicillium lenticrescens is a species of the genus of Penicillium.

References

lenticrescens
Fungi described in 2014